Songjiang Xincheng is a station of Shanghai Metro Line 9. It began operation on December 29, 2007. It served as the terminus of the line until the extension to  opened on December 30, 2012.

Railway stations in Shanghai
Shanghai Metro stations in Songjiang District
Railway stations in China opened in 2007
Line 9, Shanghai Metro